Sirmani is a neighborhood of Gabrovo in Bulgaria, located on one of Gabrovo’s hills. The neighborhood consists of an old area and a contemporary area. The greatest part of it consists of woodlands and meadows.

History 
Sirmani became a neighborhood in the early years of Ottoman rule, and hosted traditional Bulgarian cottages. The cottages were preserved as the area developed.

Origin 
The name “Sirmani” derives from the people that lived in the old cottages probably in the 15th century. Sirman means a species of fish in the family of Neogobius syrman. The area was known for the plentiful syrmans caught in the nearby lake.

Landmarks 
Two landmarks of Gabrovo are located in Sirmani: the Gabrovo Regional Hospital and the Technical University of Gabrovo.

References
 Homepage of the Technical University of Gabrovo

Neighbourhoods in Bulgaria
Gabrovo